Raymond Keith "R.J." Bowers (born February 10, 1974) is a former professional American football player in the National Football League (NFL). He was born in Honolulu, Hawaii. He played halfback and fullback for the Pittsburgh Steelers and Cleveland Browns from 2001 to 2003. He ended his college career with 7,353 rushing yards, which at the time was most in NCAA history. He held the record from 2000 to 2007, when it was surpassed by Danny Woodhead.

References

External links

Grove City College Tribute Page

1974 births
Grove City College alumni
Players of American football from Hawaii
American football running backs
Pittsburgh Steelers players
Cleveland Browns players
Living people
Grove City Wolverines football players
People from Mercer County, Pennsylvania